Pathumthani University is a university in Pathum Thani, Thailand. Founded as Pathumthani College in 1999, it was upgraded to university status in 2005. The university is organized into seven faculties and a graduate school.

See also
 List of universities in Thailand

External links 
 

Private universities and colleges in Thailand
Pathum Thani province
Educational institutions established in 1999
1999 establishments in Thailand